Henry Monsang Tesong (born 28 February 1994) is an Indian professional footballer who plays as a defender for Manipur State League side Sagolband United.

Club career
Born in Manipur, Tesong began his career in the youth squad of I-League side Pune. Prior to the 2013–14 season, Monsang was named as captain for Pune's academy squad. In September 2013, Monsang was called up to the Pune first-team for the 2013 Durand Cup. He made his first-team competitive debut for Pune on 9 September 2013 in their Durand Cup opener against Army Red.

After not securing playing time for Pune's first team, Monsang left the club and joined Manipur State League side Sagolband United. In 2017, Monsang joined I-League side Chennai City. He made his professional debut for the club on 29 November 2017 against Indian Arrows. He started and played the whole match as Chennai City were defeated 3–0.

After the season concluded, Monsang returned to Manipur and rejoined Sagolband United.

Career statistics

Club

References

1994 births
Living people
People from Manipur
Indian footballers
Association football defenders
Pune FC players
Chennai City FC players
I-League players
Footballers from Manipur